Pain Kuh (also Romanized as Pā’īn Kūh; also known as Pāeenkūh) is a village in Asir Rural District, Asir District, Mohr County, Fars Province, Iran. At the 2006 census, its population was 133, in 31 families.

References 

Populated places in Mohr County